Ahmad Masrizal bin Muhammad is a Malaysian politician who has served as the Senator from March 2020 to March 2023. He served as the Deputy Minister of Higher Education in the Barisan Nasional (BN) administration under former Prime Minister Ismail Sabri Yaakob and former Minister Noraini Ahmad from August 2021 to the collapse of the BN administration in November 2022 and the Deputy Minister of Environment and Water in the Perikatan Nasional (PN) administration under former Prime Minister Muhyiddin Yassin and former Minister Tuan Ibrahim from March 2020 to the collapse of the PN administration in August 2021. He is a member of the United Malays National Organisation (UMNO), a component party of the BN coalition.

Honours
 :
 Knight Companion of the Order of the Crown of Pahang (DIMP) – Dato' (2017)

References 

Living people
Year of birth missing (living people)